Dr. Julius Ritter von Wiesner (20 January 1838 – 9 October 1916) was a professor of botany at the University of Vienna, a specialist in the physiology and anatomy of plants.

In 1870 he became a professor at the forestry academy of Mariabrunn, and from 1873 to 1909, was a professor of plant anatomy and physiology at the University of Vienna, and at the same time (1866 to 1880) had a teaching position of technical commodity science at the Vienna University of Technology. At Vienna he founded the department of plant physiology (1873). During his career, he took part in scientific expeditions to Egypt, India, Java, Sumatra, North America and the Arctic.

His research included studies on phototropism in plants, on the formation of chlorophyll. and investigations involving the technological properties of plant raw materials.

Recognised as an accomplished botanist and author of German language books and papers — his 1881 work on the movement in plants was read and discussed by Charles Darwin — the genus Wiesneria commemorates his name.

Selected works 
 Die Entstehung des Chlorophylls in der Pflanze, 1877 – The formation of chlorophyll in plants.
 Die Heliotropischen Erscheinungen im Pflanzenreiche, 1878 – The heliotropic phenomena in the plant kingdom.
 Das Bewegungsvermögen der Pflanzen : eine kritische Studie über das gleichnamige Werk von Charles Darwin nebst neuen Untersuchungen, 1881 – The power of movement in plants, a critical study of the homonymous work of Charles Darwin, together with new studies.
  Elemente der Wissenschaftlichen Botanik, 1881-84 (two volumes) – Elements of scientific botany.
 Die Rohstoffe des Pflanzenreiches, 1900-03 (two volumes) – Raw materials of the plant kingdom.

References

External links
 

1916 deaths
1838 births
20th-century Austrian botanists
Austrian knights
University of Vienna alumni
19th-century Austrian botanists
Members of the Royal Society of Sciences in Uppsala